St. Dominic's Cathedral may refer to:

St. Dominic Cathedral, Cobán, in Guatemala
Saint Dominic's Cathedral, Fuzhou, in China
St. Dominic Cathedral, Moquegua, in Peru

See also
St. Dominic's Church (disambiguation)